KWT may refer to:
 KWT Global - public relations agency
 KWT Railway - former short line railroad (Kentucky West Tennessee)
 Kilowatt
 Kuwait
 Kwesten language
 Kwethluk Airport
 Kwun Tong station, an MTR station in Kwun Tong, Hong Kong
 Kristyn Wong-Tam